Heather Louise Graham (born 5 October 1996) is an Australian cricketer who plays for Mumbai Indians , Hobart Hurricanes and Tasmanian Tigers.

Domestic career 
In November 2018, she was named in the Perth Scorchers' squad for the 2018–19 Women's Big Bash League season. In April 2019, Cricket Australia awarded her with a contract with the National Performance Squad ahead of the 2019–20 season. In 2020, Graham moved to the Tasmanian Tigers so she could spend more time with her partner, all-rounder Emily Smith, who had moved to Tasmania in the previous season.

In 2021, she was drafted by Trent Rockets for the inaugural season of The Hundred. In November 2021, Graham reached 2 milestones in the Women's Big Bash League, during the same game against Sydney Sixers, she had scored 1000 runs and taken 100 wickets in her WBBL career.

International career 
In August 2019, Graham was named in Australia's squad for their series against the West Indies. The following month, Graham was again named in Australia's squad, this time for their series against Sri Lanka. She made her Women's One Day International (WODI) debut for Australia, against Sri Lanka, on 7 October 2019.

In January 2022, Graham was named in Australia's A squad for their series against England A, with the matches being played alongside the Women's Ashes. The following month, Graham was named as a reserve in Australia's team for the 2022 Women's Cricket World Cup in New Zealand, replacing Hannah Darlington. Graham was eventually added to Australia's squad for the World Cup as a temporary replacement for Ashleigh Gardner, after Gardner gave a positive test for COVID-19.

In July 2022, Graham was added to Australia's Women's Twenty20 International (WT20I) squad for the 2022 Ireland women's Tri-Nation Series.

References

External links

Heather Graham at Cricket Australia

1996 births
Living people
Australia women One Day International cricketers
Australia women Twenty20 International cricketers
Cricketers from Perth, Western Australia
Essex women cricketers
Lesbian sportswomen
LGBT cricketers
Australian LGBT sportspeople
Perth Scorchers (WBBL) cricketers
Sportswomen from Western Australia
Tasmanian Tigers (women's cricket) cricketers
Western Australia women cricketers
Trent Rockets cricketers
Northern Superchargers cricketers
Hobart Hurricanes (WBBL) cricketers
Mumbai Indians (WPL) cricketers
Australian expatriate sportspeople in England